Comradeship may refer to:

 Comradeship (1919 film), a British silent film drama directed by Maurice Elvey
 Kameradschaft, or Comradeship, a 1931 film directed by Georg Wilhelm Pabst

See also
 Comrade